Skizoo was a Spanish alternative metal band from Madrid formed in 2005.

History
Sôber split in 2005, and Carlos Escobedo and Alberto Madrid formed Savia and Antonio Bernardini and Jorge Escobedo formed Skizoo. Drummer Daniel Perez, bassist Daniel Criado and singer Morti recorded their debut eponymous album, released in May 2005. Daniel Criado left the group and joined Edu Fernandez, who is also responsible for the choirs on live performances. They recorded a second album, Incerteza, launched on February 19, 2007.

Band members

Final lineup
 Morti - vocals
 Jorge Escobedo - guitars
 Antonio Bernardini - guitars
 Dani Pérez -  drums
 Edu Fernandez -  bass (2005–2010)

Past members
 Daniel Criado - bass (2005)

Discography
Studio albums
 Skizoo (2005)
 2007: "Incerteza (2007)
 3 (2008)
 La Cara Oculta (2008)

External links
 MySpace page

Spanish heavy metal musical groups
Spanish rock music groups
Musical groups established in 2005